Ząbki may refer to the following places:
Ząbki, Łódź Voivodeship (central Poland)
Ząbki in Masovian Voivodeship (east-central Poland)
Ząbki, West Pomeranian Voivodeship (north-west Poland)